The Eternal Struggle is a 1923 American silent drama film directed by Reginald Barker. Distributed by Metro Pictures, the film is based on the 1913 novel The Law-Bringers, written by Edith Joan Lyttleton.

Plot
The film focuses on Andrée Grange, the daughter of a local cafe owner. She is about to marry Neil Tempest, a sergeant at the North-West Mounted Police, but is actually in love with Bucky O'Hara, one of Tempest's underlings whom she is constantly flirting with. Meanwhile, her father is attacked in his cabin by Barode Dukane. Andrée, who has witnessed the struggle, feels that she is responsible for the following death of Barode. Her father helps her flee town by ship and O'Hara is assigned to locate and arrest her. He tracks her down, but is followed by Tempest. Tempest tries to help her, but they are caught in the rapids. O'Hara eventually comes to the rescue, saving Tempest and Andrée's lives. In the end, her innocence is proven and Tempest breaks the engagement, realizing that his fiancée is in love with O'Hara.

Cast
Renée Adorée as Andrée Grange
Earle Williams as Sgt. Neil Tempest
Barbara La Marr as Camille Lenoir
Pat O'Malley as Bucky O'Hara
Wallace Beery as Barode Dukane
Josef Swickard as Pierre Grange
Pat Harmon as Oily Kirby
Anders Randolf as Capt. Jack Scott
Ed Brady as Jean Caardeau
Robert Anderson as Olaf Olafson
George Kuwa as Wo Long

Preservation status
Once thought to be a lost film, this film was one of ten silent films digitally preserved in the Russian film archive Gosfilmofond and presented to the Library of Congress in October 2010.

References

External links

1923 films
American silent feature films
American black-and-white films
1923 drama films
Silent American drama films
1920s rediscovered films
Films directed by Reginald Barker
1920s American films